Raif Nagm (1926 – 24 November 2021) was a Jordanian civil engineer and politician.

Biography
He served as Minister of Public Works and Housing from 1984 to 1985 and was also Minister of Awqaf Islamic Affairs and Holy Places.

References

1926 births
2021 deaths
Jordanian engineers
Government ministers of Jordan